Isoptericola dokdonensis is a Gram-positive and non-motile bacterium from the genus Isoptericola which has been isolated from soil in Dokdo, Korea.

References

External links
Type strain of Isoptericola dokdonensis at BacDive -  the Bacterial Diversity Metadatabase

Further reading 
 

Micrococcales
Bacteria described in 2006